Hüseynalılar (also, Hüseynallar) is a village and municipality in the Barda Rayon of Azerbaijan. It has a population of 725.

References

Populated places in Barda District